Justin Barron (born November 15, 2001) is a Canadian professional ice hockey defenceman for the  Montreal Canadiens of the National Hockey League (NHL). He was drafted 25th overall by the Colorado Avalanche during the 2020 NHL Entry Draft.

Playing career
Following three seasons for the Halifax Mooseheads of the Quebec Major Junior Hockey League (QMJHL), Barron was selected in the first round, 25th overall, by the Colorado Avalanche in the 2020 NHL Entry Draft.

Ahead of the 2020–21 season, Barron was named captain of the Mooseheads. In the pandemic-interrupted campaign, Barron recorded 31 points in 33 games for the club. On April 27, 2021, the Avalanche signed Barron to a three-year, entry-level contract. On the same day, he signed an amateur tryout agreement with the Avalanche's American Hockey League (AHL) affiliate, the Colorado Eagles. Barron made his NHL debut with the Avalanche in the 2021–22 season, appearing in a December 15, 2021 game against the New York Rangers. Cumulatively, he appeared in 50 games with the Eagles, registering six goals and eighteen assists, and two games with the Avalanche.

On March 21, 2022, Barron was traded by the Avalanche, along with a 2024 second-round draft pick, to the Montreal Canadiens in exchange for Artturi Lehkonen. He attracted positive notices on arrival in Montreal by demonstrating reasonable proficiency in French, as a result of having taken French immersion during his schooling in Nova Scotia. Barron made his debut with the team in a March 27 game against the New Jersey Devils, playing 17:55. He registered his first NHL point, an assist, in a March 29 game against the Florida Panthers. Barron scored his first NHL goal in an April 5 game against the Ottawa Senators, his first game in the Bell Centre. He suffered an ankle injury in the same game and exited early. Seven days later the team announced that he would miss the remainder of the season and would be unable to join the Laval Rocket for the Calder Cup playoffs.

After recovering from injury, it was widely assumed that Barron would make the Canadiens' roster for the 2022–23 season out of the camp. However, after was what widely judged to be an underwhelming performance in the preseason, he was instead assigned to the Laval Rocket, the franchise's AHL affiliate. He admitted that this was initially difficult to process, but after some struggles in his early games with the Rocket, he set about "to play well enough to hopefully be that first call-up, and at some point, get back up there." He was soon credited as the team's strongest defenceman. On December 27, he was recalled by the Canadiens, having managed 7 goals and 9 assists in 25 AHL games.

International play

 

Barron was selected to play for Team Canada at the 2021 World Junior Ice Hockey Championships. He had two assists in seven games as Canada was defeated by the United States in the gold medal game.

Personal life
Barron's older brother, Morgan, is a professional ice hockey player for the Winnipeg Jets.

Career statistics

Regular season and playoffs

International

References

External links

2001 births
Living people
Canadian ice hockey defencemen
Colorado Avalanche draft picks
Colorado Avalanche players
Colorado Eagles players
Halifax Mooseheads players
Ice hockey people from Nova Scotia
Laval Rocket players
Montreal Canadiens players
National Hockey League first-round draft picks
Sportspeople from Halifax, Nova Scotia